José García Nieto (Oviedo, 6 July 1914 – Madrid, 27 February 2001), was a Spanish poet and writer. In 1996, he was awarded the Miguel de Cervantes Prize. Along with Gabriel Celaya, Blas de Otero and José Hierro, he was a member of the post-war generation of Spanish poets.

Biography 
José García Nieto, was born in Oviedo, on 6 July 1914, at 8, la calle Portugalete (now, 6 Melquíades Álvarez). His parents were José García Lueso and María de La Encarnación Nieto Fernández.

In 1950, he won the Premio Adonais for Dama de soledad; in 1955 he won the Premio Fastenrath awarded by the Real Academia Española for Geografía es amor.

In 1951 and 1957, he won the Premio Nacional de Literatura de España; in 1980 he won the Premio Mariano de Cavia.

In 1987 he won Premio González-Ruano. In 1996 he won the Cervantes Prize.

Works 
Víspera hacia ti (1940)
Poesía (1944)
Versos de un huésped de Luisa Esteban (1944)
Tú y yo sobre la tierra (1944)
Retablo de ángel, el hombre y la pastora (1944)
Del campo y soledad (1946)
Juego de los doce espejos (1951)
Tregua (1951). Premio Nacional de Literatura
La red (1955). Premio Fastenrath
Geografía es amor (1956). Premio Nacional de Literatura
El parque pequeño (1959)
Corpus Chisti y seis sonetos (1962)
Circunstancias de la muerte (1963)
La hora undécima (1963)
Memorias y compromisos (1966)
Hablando solo (1967). Premio Ciudad de Barcelona
Facultad de volver (1970)
Taller de arte menor y cincuenta sonetos (1973)
Súplica por la paz del mundo y otros "collages" (1973). Premio Boscán
Sonetos y revelaciones de Madrid (1974)
Los cristales fingidos (1978)
El arrabal (1980)
Nuevo elogio de la lengua española (1983)
Sonetos españoles a Bolívar (1983)
Donde el mundo no cesa de referir su historia (1983) -prosa-
Piedra y cielo de Roma (1984)
Carta a la madre (1988)
Mar viviente (1989)
El cuaderno roto (1989) -prosa-

See also
 Café Gijón (Madrid)

External links 
Cronología
José García Nieto en el Centro Virtual Cervantes
Poemas en torno a la creación poética

1914 births
2001 deaths
People from Oviedo
Spanish male poets
20th-century Spanish poets
20th-century Spanish male writers
Premio Cervantes winners